Passion For Life is a combination DVD / live album by Estradasphere. It was released on March 9, 2004.

Track listing

DVD
"Hardball"
"Ah Ya Bibi"
"Buck Fever"
"Nütch"
"Mekapses Yitonisa"
"Danse of Tosho and Slavi / Randy's Desert Adventure"
"A Very Intense Battle"
"Body Slam"
"Princes of Xibalba"
"King Krab Battle"
"Disco Time"

CD
"Dissatisfactual Contraband" – 1:22
"Feed Your Mama's Meter" – 6:13
"Planet Sparkle" – 1:02
"Bat Cave" – 2:04
"Hora Bucharestu vs. Narodnokolo (Gypsy Medley)" – 11:35
"Tugboat" – 5:39
"Whollilicious" – 4:05
"Kiss Tomorrow Goodbye" – 5:57
"Graze-A-Holic" – 4:03
"Danse of Tosho and Slavi/Randy's Desert Adventure" – 10:53
"Elderly Normal Samurai Tortoises" – 2:30
"Boss III" – 0:32
"Db Hell" – 9:02
"Body Slam (Lounge Version)" – 8:48

Cast and crew

The band
Timb Harris
Jason Schimmel
Tim Smolens
John Whooley

Special guest drummers
Dave Murray
Theo Mordey

Producers
Mark Thornton
Stephen Reysen

DVD Map

Main Menu
Options:
Play movie
Jump to a Song
Audio Options
Bonus Songs
Music Videos
Menu music: "King Krab Battle" (from Quadropus) and Mike Seifert as Dr. Mystery

"Passion for Life" Scenes
Intro
"Hardball"
Theo Mordey
"Ah Ya Bibi"
Buck Fever photoshoot
"Buck Fever"
Embrace the jam
"Nutch"
In the studio
"Mekapses Yitonisa"
Whoolilicious!
"The Danse of Tosho and Slavi/Randy's Desert Adventure"
Dave Murray
"A Very Intense Battle"
Freezer mistake
Sheepman
"Bodyslam"
Drama
"The Princes of Xibalba"
Health food rock and roll
"King Krab Battle"
Credits
"Disco Time/Burnt Corpse"

Jump to a Song
Menu music: "King Solomon" from 3/12/03 at Hipster's, Odessa, Texas.

Audio Options
Options:
Dolby Surround 4.1
Dolby Stereo
Commentary #1 with the band
Commentary #2 the Goon Track
Hidden Option:
September 2, 2000
"Contra" - Estradasphere recite the Konami Code and play music from the video game Contra. The performance is dedicated to Chip Yamada.
"Jungle Warfare > Very Intense Battle" - A heavy metal duet with Dave Murray and Jason Schimmel.
Menu music: "Pomp and Circumstance" from 2000 Kresge College graduation.

Bonus Songs
Options:
"Musicawi Silt" with Secret Chiefs 3
Recorded live November 11, 2000 at 14 Below, Santa Monica, California
Song Medley with Farmers Market
Recorded live December 6, 2002 at Kuumbwa Jazz Center, Santa Cruz, California
"Randy's Desert Adventure" alternate performance
Recorded live June 20, 2003 at Vet's Hall, Santa Cruz, California
Also contains "90210" (Theme to Beverly Hills, 90210)
"Harvest Home Hornpipe"
Recorded live August 8, 2001 at Foufounes Electrique, Montreal, Quebec
"Millennium Child"
Recorded live March 13, 2000 at the Catalyst, Santa Cruz, California
Also contains "90210"
Hidden Option:
Random Stuff by VERG
Live clip of "Turtle Power" at Troubador featuring Mark Thornton.
Clips of Steve the Taper and 404 Karl
Extra interview with Tim Smolens at ROHYPONOL_Studios911
Menu music: "Super Mario Bros.", "Que Lindo", "?" and "All of Me" from 2/18/00 at Westlake Elementary School Gymnasium, Santa Cruz, California

Music videos
Options:
"The Silent Elk of Yesterday" directed by Chip Yamada
The Making of Silent Elk
"Dubway"
"Burnt Corpse"
Menu music: "What Deers May Come" from 5/12/01 at Palookaville

Secret Menu #1
Options:
"Crocodile Rock" - Previously unreleased performance from the filming of GrooveTV episode 203.
"Medley #3" Recorded by Marco Walsh, GrooveTV episode 203 - Contains "No Greater Love", "Misirlou" and "Girl from Ipanema".
MTV2 Promo for SXSW Festival

Estradasphere albums
2004 live albums
2004 video albums
Live video albums